The following is an alphabetical list of members of the United States House of Representatives from the state of Nebraska.  For chronological tables of members of both houses of the United States Congress from the state (through the present day), see United States congressional delegations from Nebraska.  The list of names should be complete (as of June 28, 2022), but other data may be incomplete. It includes members who have represented both the state and the territory, both past and present.

Current members

Updated June 28, 2022.
 : Mike Flood (R) (2022)
 : Don Bacon (R) (2017)
 : Adrian Smith (R) (2007)

List of members and delegates

See also

List of United States senators from Nebraska
United States congressional delegations from Nebraska
Nebraska's congressional districts

References

Nebraska
 
United States representatives